Park Sok-min (Hangul: 박석민; born June 22, 1985, in Daegu, South Korea) is an infielder who plays for the NC Dinos in the Korea Baseball Organization. He is nicknamed Beu-Kol-Dwae (Hangul: 브콜돼). He bats and throws right-handed.

Professional career 
After graduating from Daegu High School in 2004, Park made himself eligible for the  KBO Draft and was selected by the Samsung Lions in the first round of the draft. However, he failed to make an impact in the rookie season, serving backup infielder during the whole season.

In , Park returned to the Lions and became the starting third baseman for Samsung.

In 2015, Park signed a four-year, $8.12 million, contract with the NC Dinos, becoming the most expensive third baseman—breaking the 4 year, $7.28 million mark previously set by Choi Jeong of the SK Wyverns—in the KBO.

On July 16, 2021, Park was suspended the remainder of the season (72 games with 70 games left) after breaking COVID-19 social distancing rules.

Characteristics
His nicknamed Beu-Kol-Dwae (Hangul: 브콜돼), which literally translates into broccoli + pig. This nickname derives from his stocky figure and curly hair.

References

External links 
 Career statistics and player information from Korea Baseball Organization

1985 births
2017 World Baseball Classic players
KBO League third basemen
Living people
Samsung Lions players
South Korean baseball players
Sportspeople from Daegu